Quezon's 1st congressional district is one of the four congressional districts of the Philippines in the province of Quezon, formerly Tayabas. It has been represented in the House of Representatives of the Philippines since 1916 and earlier in the Philippine Assembly from 1907 to 1916. The district consists of Quezon's former capital city of Tayabas and adjacent municipalities of Burdeos, General Nakar, Infanta, Jomalig, Lucban, Mauban, Pagbilao, Panukulan, Patnanungan, Polillo, Real and Sampaloc. It is currently represented in the 19th Congress by Wilfrido Mark M. Enverga of the Nationalist People's Coalition (NPC).

Representation history

Election results

2022

2019

2016

2013

2010

See also
Legislative districts of Quezon

References

Congressional districts of the Philippines
Politics of Quezon
1907 establishments in the Philippines
Congressional districts of Calabarzon
Constituencies established in 1907